The Tsawataineuk First Nation is a First Nations band government in the Queen Charlotte Strait region north of northern Vancouver Island in the Canadian province of British Columbia.  It is a member of the Musgamagw Tsawataineuk Tribal Council, along with the Gwawaenuk and the Kwicksutaineuk-ah-kwa-mish First Nation.

The territory of the Tsawataineuk First Nation spans the whole of Broughton Archipelago on the northern side of Queen Charlotte Strait and adjoining areas of the BC mainland.  The main village of the Tsawataineuk people is Gwa'Yi, at the mouth of the Kingcome River.

As of November 2007, there were 59 people living in the community.

See also
Kingcome Inlet, British Columbia
Kingcome, British Columbia
Queen Charlotte Strait
Kwakwaka'wakw
Kwak'wala (language)

Kwakwaka'wakw governments
Central Coast of British Columbia